Roar Hauglid (26 December 1910 - 18 November 2001) was a Norwegian art historian, antiquarian and publicist.

Biography
Hauglid was born in Kristiania, now Oslo, Norway in 1910. He was the son of Kristian Hauglid (1864–1927) and Hedvig Hansen (1871–1946). He attended Oslo Cathedral School and the  University of Oslo and received his magister degree in 1937 and doctorate in 1950. 
 

He worked as an antiquarian and wrote several books on Norwegian cultural history, most notably stave churches. He replaced Arne Nygård-Nilssen as head of the Norwegian Directorate for Cultural Heritage, serving from 1958 to 1977. He was decorated Knight, First Class of the Order of St. Olav, and Commander of the Order of the Polar Star.

Selected works
Norway: A Thousand Years of Native Arts and Crafts (1959)
Native Art of Norway (1967)
Norwegian Stave Churches  (1977)

References

1910 births
2001 deaths
Writers from Oslo
People educated at Oslo Cathedral School 
University of Oslo alumni
Norwegian art historians
Directors of government agencies of Norway
Commanders of the Order of the Polar Star
 Recipients of the St. Olav's Medal